Wallingford Rowing Club is a rowing club on the River Thames by Thames Street, Wallingford, Oxfordshire.

History
The club was formed in 1947 by the Wallingford Regatta committee. The blade colours are scarlet with a light blue tip; kit: likewise. In December 2013 the club opened a new gym facility.

Honours

British champions

Key - M men, W women, + coxed, - coxless, x sculls, c composite, L lightweight

Henley Royal Regatta

See also
Rowing on the River Thames

References

Sport in Oxfordshire
Wallingford, Oxfordshire
Rowing clubs of the River Thames
Buildings and structures on the River Thames
Rowing clubs in England
Rowing clubs in Oxfordshire